"Ever Dream" is the sixth single by Finnish symphonic metal band Nightwish. Released as the lead single from the band's fourth studio album, Century Child, it was the group's first single release in two years, following "Deep Silent Complete" in 2000.

The song is of a more operatic nature than later works and the music itself is more on the heavy metal side. It still being played live since 2002 until today. "Ever Dream" was certified with Gold Disc in Finland two days after release, with more than 5,000 sold copies, and later got Platinum Disc with more than 10,000 sold copies.

Live performances 
In live performances of the song, the intro is played differently, with only the keyboard and vocals present for the first verse, before all the band comes in after the intro.

"Ever Dream" was written for the voice of Tarja Turunen. She sang the song less operatically than earlier songs, such as "Sacrament of Wilderness". Nightwish still played it live with Anette Olzon, who replaced Turunen in 2007, and currently with Floor Jansen, though they have not recorded a version with either. Olzon changed some notes in the performances to better fit her vocal range and style, for instance: she sings the chorus in a less operatic style.

"Ever Dream" was the demo recorded by Olzon and sent to the band as her audition to replace Turunen.

When asked about her favorite song from Nightwish's first albums, Olzon said:

Track listing 
 "Ever Dream" – 4:43
 "The Phantom of the Opera" (Andrew Lloyd Webber cover) – 4:09
 "The Wayfarer" (non-album track) – 3:25

Sales and certifications

Personnel
Tarja Turunen – Lead vocals
Emppu Vuorinen – Guitars
Marko Hietala – Bass guitar, male vocals
Tuomas Holopainen – Keyboards
Jukka Nevalainen – Drums

References

External links
 

2002 singles
Nightwish songs
Number-one singles in Finland
Songs written by Tuomas Holopainen
2002 songs